Rear Enz is a 1992 album of rarities released by New Zealand rock music group Split Enz, comprising b-sides, demos and a non-album single ranging from 1980 to 1984.

Track listing

References

1992 compilation albums
Split Enz compilation albums